Demetrio Carceller Coll is a Portuguese billionaire heir and businessman.

Carceller Coll inherited two companies from his father, Demetrio Carceller Segura, the petrol station chain Disa Corp, and the Spanish brewery Damm. He is a part owner in the Spanish food company Ebro Foods and the property company Sacyr.

Carceller Coll is married, with four children, and lives in London and Portugal. His businesses are now run by his son, Demetrio Carceller Arce.

References

Living people
Portuguese billionaires
Portuguese businesspeople
Year of birth missing (living people)